Narasingapuram is a village in the Pattukkottai taluk of Thanjavur district, Tamil Nadu, India.

Demographics 

As per the 2001 census, Narasingapuram had a total population of 1697 with 861 males and 836 females. The sex ratio was 971. The literacy rate was 61.72.

References 

 

Villages in Thanjavur district